Alan Comfort (born 8 December 1964) is an English former professional footballer who played as a winger. Active between 1980 and 1989 before his career was cut short by injury, Comfort played for four teams, scoring 53 goals in 228 games in the Football League.

Career
Born in Aldershot, Comfort began his career at Queens Park Rangers, turning professional in 1980. After spending four years at Queens Park Rangers without making an appearance in the Football League, Comfort signed for Cambridge United in 1984. In two seasons with Cambridge, Comfort scored five goals in 63 games, before moving to Leyton Orient in early 1986. Comfort spent three-and-a-half seasons with Orient, scoring 46 goals in 150 appearances.

After moving to Middlesbrough in 1989, where he scored 2 goals in 15 games, Comfort's career was cut short by a knee injury at the age of 25. After playing in the 1989 Football League Fourth Division play-off Final, Comfort took a helicopter to Heathrow Airport in order to catch a flight to Ireland for his wedding later that day.

Post-retirement
After retirement, Comfort spent time as a radio commentator for Teesside radio station TFM.

In the mid-1990s, Comfort became a Church of England priest and served as chaplain to Leyton Orient for 21 years, leaving the role in 2014.

References

1964 births
Living people
Sportspeople from Aldershot
Association football wingers
English footballers
Queens Park Rangers F.C. players
Leyton Orient F.C. players
Middlesbrough F.C. players
Cambridge United F.C. players
English Football League players
Footballers from Hampshire
Leyton Orient F.C. non-playing staff
20th-century English Anglican priests
21st-century English Anglican priests